Gucheng is a town in Fuchuan Yao Autonomous County, Guangxi, China.

Administrative division
As of 2016, the town is divided into one community and nine villages: 

 Hengshan Community
 Lijiang
 Chayuan
 Shantian
 Gaolu
 Mojia
 Xiushan
 Tangbei
 Yang
 Daling

History
It belonged to the Second District after the founding of the Communist State. In 1952 it belonged to the Tenth District. In 1958 the Yingxiong Commune was set up and two years later it was renamed "Gucheng Commune". In 2003 it was upgraded to a town.

Economy
Agriculture including farming and pig-breeding is the most common activity in the province. The main crops of the region are grains, followed by fruits and vegetables.

Transportation
The town is connected to two highways: the China National Highway G538 and the Provincial Highway S203.

References

Bibliography

Towns of Hezhou